Henri Richelet (16 June 1944 – 18 March 2020) was a French painter.

Biography
Born to primary school teachers in a small village close to Domrémy, the birthplace of Joan of Arc, Henri Richelet spent his childhood and adolescence in the neighbouring small town of Neufchâteau (Vosges). After his Baccalauréat, he first attended the École des Beaux-Arts in Nancy, then the École nationale supérieure des Beaux-Arts in Paris. In 1968, Richelet got the First Grand Prix of the Casa de Velázquez, Madrid in the etching category. He has been living in Paris since the seventies after having spent a few years in Quebec. He was married to the Chilean painter Ximena Armas.

Besides his participation in group exhibitions since 1963, Richelet made numerous solo exhibitions between 1965 and 2007 in France, Quebec and Chile. He also regularly took part in several salons such as: Salon d'Automne, Salon de Mai, Salon Comparaisons, Salon Grands et jeunes d’aujourd’hui, Salon de Boulogne-Billancourt, Salon d'art contemporain de Montrouge, Salon Figuration critique.

During the COVID-19 pandemic, Richelet died of COVID-19 on 18 March 2020 in Paris, aged 75.

Works 
Richelet's provocative humour made him choose gloomy colours. Following the tradition of Caravaggio, or of Georges de La Tour in his Saint Jérôme pénitent, he uses dark backgrounds to make livid and pallid flesh of tense, hunched up bodies stand out. ″Vanitas vanitatum, omnia vanitas,″ he was fond of reminding us. This apophthegm haunts many works of Richelet, where his obsession with sex and death is expressed by a parallel between impotence and incapacity to create. One can be surprised, in some of his canvases, by the warm vermilion of a drape, a borrowing which would not have been renounced by the two old masters he so admired.

Energetic lines in Richelet's paintings, drawings, and etchings oddly bring corpses, broken and mutilated in their physical beauty, on the verge of death.

Works in museum collections 
 Museo Nacional de Bellas Artes, Santiago, Chile :
Ne pas toucher : Indian ink on paper (51 x 60 cm).
 Museo de la Solidaridad Salvador Allende, Santiago, Chile :
 Derniers outrages : oil painting on canvas (100 x 81 cm).

Solo exhibitions

 1965 : Casino de Contrexéville, France.
 1968 : Maison des Beaux-Arts, Paris.
 1971 :
 Galerie Beaudelaire, Quebec.
 Galerie Chantauteuil, Quebec.
 1974 : Galerie L’Art du Monde, Paris.
 1976 : Galerie L'Estuaire, Honfleur, France.
 1990 : Galerie Ceibo, Paris.
 1996 : Hôtel de Ville, Neufchâteau, France.
 1998 : Galerie Thermale, Contrexéville, France.
 1999 : Galería Modigliani, Viña del Mar, Chile.
 2001 :
 Musée Roybet–Fould, Courbevoie, France.
 Galerie Aux créations du possible, Paris.
 Museo Nacional de Bellas Artes, Santiago, Chile.
 2006 : Galería Modigliani,  Viña del Mar, Chile.
 2007 : Le Trait d’Union,  Neufchâteau, France.

Main group exhibitions

 1969 & 1970 :
 Casa de Velázquez, Madrid.
 Salle Comtesse de Caen, Institut de France, Paris.
 1977–1978 : La Boîte, ARC 2, Musée d'Art Moderne, Paris.
 1981 : Cent gravures contemporaines, Aulnay-sous-Bois, France.
 1982 & 1987 :
 Casa de Velázquez, Madrid.
 Salle Comtesse de Caen, Institut de France, Paris.
 1991 : Art contemporain international, Château de la Bonnetière, Haut-Poitou, France.
 1996 : 3e Festival de l’art actuel, Château d’O, Orne, France.
 1997 : Dialogue Est-Ouest Art Festival, Vayolles, France.
 2000 : Variations, Espace Belleville, Paris.
 2003 : Hommage à S. Allende, Ris-Orangis, France.
 2004 : George Sand, interprétations, Couvent des Cordeliers, Châteauroux, France.

Bibliography

References

External links 

  Henri Richelet's official Web site
 Animated self-portraits (requires Adobe Flash Player)
 Recent pastels
 Recent drawings

1944 births
2020 deaths
People from Vosges (department)
École des Beaux-Arts alumni
20th-century French painters
20th-century French male artists
French male painters
21st-century French painters
21st-century French male artists
French etchers
French erotic artists
French lithographic artists
20th-century French printmakers
Deaths from the COVID-19 pandemic in France